In cryptography, NLS is a stream cypher algorithm designed by Gregory Rose, Philip Hawkes, Michael Paddon, and Miriam Wiggers de Vries. It has been submitted to the eSTREAM Project of the eCRYPT network.

Stream ciphers